Paolo Regio (1545-1607) was a Roman Catholic prelate who served as Bishop of Vico Equense (1583–1607).

Biography
Paolo Regio was born in 1545.
On 10 January 1583, he was appointed during the papacy of Pope Gregory XIII as Bishop of Vico Equense. He served as Bishop of Vico Equense until his death in 1607.

References

External links and additional sources
 (for Chronology of Bishops) 
 (for Chronology of Bishops)  

16th-century Italian Roman Catholic bishops
17th-century Italian Roman Catholic bishops
Bishops appointed by Pope Gregory XIII
1545 births
1607 deaths